The Present is the eleventh album by the Moody Blues, released in 1983. This was the group's last original studio album to be released on their custom label, Threshold Records.

Overview
The album is the second of the Patrick Moraz era. It provided three minor hit singles in the U.S. with "Blue World" (#62), "Sitting at the Wheel" (#27) and "Running Water".

The album has a track sequence designed to capitalise on the legacy of the more successful Long Distance Voyager, with Justin Hayward's songs at the beginning and Ray Thomas's at the end. In November 2008 the album was remastered and released on CD with two extra tracks.

The cover is a pastiche of Maxfield Parrish's painting Daybreak.

Original track listing

Side One

 "Blue World" (Justin Hayward) – 5:20 (lead singer: Justin Hayward)
 "Meet Me Halfway" (Hayward, John Lodge) – 4:08 (lead singers: Justin Hayward, John Lodge)
 "Sitting at the Wheel" (Lodge) – 5:40 (lead singer: John Lodge)
 "Going Nowhere" (Graeme Edge) – 5:33 (lead singer: Ray Thomas)

Side Two

 "Hole in the World" (Lodge) – 1:54 (instrumental)
 "Under My Feet" (Lodge) – 4:51 (lead singer: John Lodge)
 "It's Cold Outside of Your Heart" (Hayward) – 4:27 (lead singer: Justin Hayward)
 "Running Water" (Hayward) – 3:23 (lead singer: Justin Hayward)
 "I Am" (Ray Thomas) – 1:40 (lead singer: Ray Thomas)
 "Sorry" (Thomas) – 5:02 (lead singer: Ray Thomas)

2008 remastered CD expanded edition

The 2008 release contains two extra tracks:

"Blue World" (Single Edit)" – 3:38
 "Sitting at the Wheel (Steve Greenberg Remix)" – 7:32

Personnel

The Moody Blues

Justin Hayward – vocals, guitar
John Lodge – vocals, bass guitar
Ray Thomas – vocals, harmonica, flute
Graeme Edge – drums
Patrick Moraz – keyboards, synthesizers

Additional personnel
Pip Williams – sequencing

Charts

Certifications

References

External links
  "Blue World" Official Music Video (YouTube)
  "Sitting at the Wheel" Official Music Video (YouTube)

The Moody Blues albums
1983 albums
Threshold Records albums
Albums recorded at Strawberry Studios
Albums produced by Pip Williams